Blanka is a feminine given name. Notable people with the name include:

Blanka of Namur (1320–1363), queen-consort of Sweden and Norway
Blanka Amezkua (b. 1971), Mexican artist
Blanka Bíró (1994), Hungarian handball goalkeeper
Blanka Lipińska (b. 1985), Polish erotic writer
Blanka Paulů (b. 1954), Czech cross country skier
Blanka Pěničková (b. 1980), Czech footballer
Blanka Říhová (born 1942), Czech immunologist
Blanka Stajkow (b. 1999), Polish singer and model
Blanka Šrůmová (b. 1965), Czech singer-songwriter
Blanka Szávay (b. 1993), Hungarian tennis player, sister of Ágnes Szávay
Blanka Teleki (1806–1862), Hungarian noblewoman
Blanka Vlašić (b. 1983), Croatian high jumper
Blanka Waleská (1910–1986), Czech actress
Blanka Wladislaw (1917–2012), Brazilian-Polish chemist
Blanka Zizka (b. 1955), American theatre director

See also 
Blanca (given name), a feminine given name
Bianca, a feminine given name
Bianka, a feminine given name
Branca, a feminine given name
Branka, a feminine given name

Hungarian feminine given names